Saerom Park (Saerom Emma Lou Park, 박새롬, born June 23, 1981), is a Korean-German cellist.

Saerom Park's musical activities have already taken her across Europe, East Asia and South Africa in performances as both soloist and chamber musician. Born in 1981 to an artists-family in Korea, her education began at the age of 3 with piano studies switching to cello at 12. Her talent was recognized rapidly. She was awarded at numerous national competitions, shortly after in 1996 her major orchestral debut was made with the Moscow Chamber Orchestra.

During the senior year of high school, Saerom moved to Germany to accomplish her studies at the Folkwang Hochschule in Essen where she studied both cello and chamber music with Young-Chang Cho and Andreas Reiner. Further advances were made under great influence of renowned tutors such as Bernard Greenhouse, Boris Pergamenschikov, Alexander Kniazev, and Matt Haimovitz.

In 2000, Saerom Park founded the piano trio Trio Image with violinist Gergana Gergova and pianist Pavlin Nechev. She was active member of the trio until 2007. In support of the European Chamber Music Academy (ECMA) the trio collaborated with musicians like Hatto Beyerle, Shumuel Ashkenazy, Erich Höbarth, Gábor Tacásc-Nagy, Johannes Meissl, Christoph Richter and Avedis Kouyoumdjan. Trio Image was the 3rd prize and the public prize winner at the 6th International Competition "Franz Schubert and Modern Music" held in Graz, Austria, and scholarship holder of the Werner Richard-Carl Dörken Foundation for the 2005/06 season.

An avid chamber musician, Saerom has appeared at various festivals, most notably at the Lockenhaus Kammermusikfest, the Pablo Casals Festival in Prades, Schubertiade Akzenbrugg, International Cello Fest Beograd, International Week Graz, Festival de musique de chambre en Normandie, International Music Festival Varna Summer where she has performed with such distinguished artists as Claude Frank, Joseph Silverstein, Vladimir Mendelssohn, and Michel Strauss. She was recorded by WDR 3, ORF, Mezzo TV.

Currently residing in Hamburg, Saerom Park works as Ensemble Resonanz' principal cellist.

References

External links
 Official website

1981 births
Place of birth missing (living people)
Living people
German classical cellists
Cellists